gLinux is a Debian Testing-based Linux distribution used at Google as a workstation operating system. The Google gLinux team builds the system from source code, introducing their own changes. gLinux replaced the previously used Ubuntu-based distribution, Goobuntu. gLinux is usually installed by loading into a bootstrap environment when it is first booted up. When gLinux is getting started up, the root files are unpacked and the Debian installer starts to perform the installation. Over the years, Google has focused on speed, scale, and data which is the thought process that allowed them to move to gLinux. Google was using Ubuntu before switching to gLinux; however, the two years of security updates it provided meant that planning for the next upgrade would take next to a year.

References 

Google software
Debian-based distributions
Linux distributions